Margo Ilene Seltzer is a professor and researcher in computer systems. She is currently the Canada 150 Research Chair in Computer Systems and the Cheriton Family Chair in Computer Science at the University of British Columbia. Previously, Seltzer was the Herchel Smith Professor of Computer Science at Harvard University's John A. Paulson School of Engineering and Applied Sciences and director at the Center for Research on Computation and Society.

Education

Seltzer received her A.B. in Applied Mathematics at Harvard/Radcliffe College in 1983, where she was teaching assistant under Harry R. Lewis at Harvard University. In 1992, she received her  Ph.D. in computer science from the University of California, Berkeley where her dissertation, "File System Performance and Transaction Support", was supervised by Michael Stonebraker.  Her work in log-structured file systems, databases, and wide-scale caching is especially well-known, and she was lead author of the BSD-LFS paper.

Career

Academia
Seltzer became an Assistant Professor of Computer Science at Harvard University in 1992, and an Associate Professor in 1997. She held endowed chairs as a Gordon McKay Professor of Computer Science in 2000, and as the Herchel Smith Professor of Computer Science in 2004. From 2005 to 2010, Seltzer was designated a Harvard College Professor in recognition of "particularly distinguished contributions to undergraduate teaching." Seltzer was the Associate Dean of the School of Engineering and Applied Sciences from 2002 to 2006, and an advisor to the Harvard Undergraduate Women in Computer Science.

In September 2018, Seltzer joined the faculty at the University of British Columbia Department of Computer Science as the Canada 150 Research Chair in Computer Systems and the Cheriton Family Chair in Computer Science. In February 2019, she was elected a member of the National Academy of Engineering.

Business
Seltzer was Chief Technical Officer of Sleepycat Software (developers of the Berkeley DB embedded database) from 1996 to 2006, when the company was acquired by Oracle Corporation.  She served as an architect on the Oracle Berkeley DB team for several years before transferring to Oracle Labs where she continues to act as an architect.

Seltzer was a director of USENIX from 2005 to 2014, serving as vice president for one year and president for two. In 2019, she received the USENIX Lifetime Achievement Award for her seminal work on BerkeleyDB and provenance systems and her dedication to the USENIX community at large.

In 2011, Seltzer was made a Fellow of the Association for Computing Machinery (the Association's highest member grade) in recognition of "outstanding accomplishments in computing and information technology and/or outstanding service to ACM and the larger computing community." In July 2020, Seltzer accepted the SIGMOD Software Systems award on behalf of the Sleepycat Software team.

Personal life
She is married to software developer Keith Bostic.

References

External links

http://mis-misinformation.blogspot.com/
Appreciation of Margo Seltzer for Ada Lovelace Day by Aaron Swartz

Living people
Year of birth missing (living people)
American computer scientists
American women computer scientists
University of California, Berkeley alumni
Harvard University faculty
Fellows of the Association for Computing Machinery
Radcliffe College alumni
American chief technology officers
Women chief technology officers
Academic staff of the University of British Columbia
American women academics
21st-century American women